New Bedford High School (NBHS) is a public high school located at 230 Hathaway Boulevard in the West End of New Bedford, Massachusetts.  The school has approximately 2,000 students, and is one of the largest schools in the state. New Bedford is also one of the largest high schools in the country, being ranked in the Top 200 high schools in the country based on enrollment. It is a part of the New Bedford Public Schools school district.

The high school serves Acushnet as its district, along with Fairhaven High School and Academy of the Fairhaven School District , takes Acushnet students for secondary school.

History
In 2011, 169 of the students were from Acushnet. By 2014 this was down to 60, reflecting how Acushnet students increasingly chose Fairhaven High.

Extracurricular activities

The school's athletic teams are named the Whalers, in honor of the city's whaling history. The New Bedford High School teams wear red and white, and compete in the Massachusetts Interscholastic Athletic Association's Division I.  Their fight song, "On, New Bedford" is sung to the tune of "On, Wisconsin!"

Basketball

The boys' basketball program at New Bedford High School has long been one of the most successful in the state. Ed Rodrigues coached the varsity team for 27 years (1980–2007). During his tenure as head coach, the Whalers were one of the state's top-performing teams year after year and made numerous appearances in the state tournament, winning back-to-back Division 1 State titles in 1993 and 1994. His teams also won two additional Eastern Massachusetts Finals and two additional South Sectional titles. There were only two losing seasons in his career. On February 21, 2007, Rodrigues coached his final game at New Bedford High School. The Whalers lost to the visiting St. Raphael Academy Saints of Pawtucket, Rhode Island 69–66. Rodrigues ended his tenure at the school with a career record of 435–157. He continues to be a teacher at the school, is still heavily involved with the basketball program and the entire athletic department, and is currently an assistant men's basketball coach at UMass Dartmouth. In 2009, New Bedford High School's basketball court was officially dedicated in Rodrigues' name.

Long-time boys' assistant/junior varsity coach Tom Tarpey took over as head coach at the start of the 2007–08 season. In his first season, the Whalers went 11–9 in the regular season and made the state tournament. They lost in the first round of the Division I South Sectional on the road to the Framingham Flyers 69–62. The following season (2008–09), the boys finished with a record of 8-12 and did not qualify for the tournament. They also did not qualify in 2009–10 with a 7–13 record. With the experience of the underclassmen, plus the brief addition of a highly touted prospect transferred from Division III State champions the Wareham Vikings, a huge turnaround occurred in the 2010–11 season. The Whalers returned to prominence and finished the regular season with a record of 16–3, earning the 3rd seed in the Division I South Sectional tournament. They lost in the sectional semifinals to the Newton North Tigers 67–44.

In the 2007–08 school year, the girls' basketball team captured the Division I South Sectional title by defeating the Sandwich High Blue Knights 65–62 at UMass Boston, giving them the opportunity to compete in the Eastern Massachusetts Finals at the TD Banknorth Garden in Boston; they lost to the Division I North champion Andover High Golden Warriors 66–34. Head coach Mickey Gonsalves was named Division 1 Girls' Basketball Coach of the Year by the Boston Globe. In the 2010–11 season, the Lady Whalers completed an undefeated regular season at 20-0 when they defeated the visiting Barnstable Red Raiders 63–44. They earned the top seed in the Division I South Sectional tournament and won their second South Sectional title by defeating the Mansfield Hornets 47–46 at the now TD Garden. The Lady Whalers lost in the Eastern Mass Finals to North Sectional champion Andover 54–46, also at the Garden.

Basketball Accomplishments
Boys' Basketball: Division 1 State Champions - 1993, 1994

Volleyball

In the 2009–10 school year, the girls' volleyball team completed an undefeated season (23–0), culminating in the state championship for Division I. Junior outside hitter Maura Manley led the state with 408 kills on the season and received numerous honors, including a nomination for the Gatorade Player of the Year in Massachusetts and a MaxPreps/AVCA Player of the Week nod. At the end of the season, the team was the number 1 team in the state and 48th in the nation according to MaxPreps.com and was ranked 50th on the site's "final Xcellent 50 High School Girls' Volleyball National Rankings". 26-year head coach Neil Macedo was inducted into the 2009 Massachusetts Girls' Volleyball Coaches Association Hall of Fame. Only one senior, Kiana Raposo, was featured on this squad. The following year's team was heavily favored to repeat as state champions but were defeated in the Division I South Sectional final by  rejuvenated 13-time Division 1 state champion powerhouse and archrival Barnstable High School. Dartmouth College-bound Maura Manley was named Gatorade Massachusetts Volleyball Player of the Year for the 2010–2011 school year.

Volleyball Accomplishments
 Girls' Volleyball: Division 1 State Champions - 1994, 2009
 Boys' Volleyball: Division 1 State Champions - 1989, 1991, 1993, 1994, 1995, 1997, 1998, 1999

Baseball

The school's baseball team won 3 State Championships in the 1990s. In 1858 New Bedford High School fielded a team making them the first high school or secondary school in the country to do so.
NBHS won in 1993, 1994, and 1998.

Music

The school has an award-winning marching band, winning several regional and state championships. On January 20, 1997, the marching band had the honor of performing in the inaugural parade during the second inauguration of Bill Clinton in Washington. The school fight song, On, New Bedford!, is sung to the tune of On, Wisconsin!, which is primarily performed during football games and the annual pep rally. New Bedford High School also has a very prominent show choir, who like the band, competes in regional and New England competitions. New Bedford High School also has an award-winning jazz band and jazz combo that play in local events and regional festivals.

Football

In 2010–11 school year, the football team upset football powerhouse Brockton High School 23–21, followed by a 21-7 Thanksgiving Day victory over Fall River's B.M.C. Durfee High School, to earn its first Big Three Conference title since 1999 and earn a spot in the Division I Eastern Massachusetts Super Bowl for the first time since 2001. They lost in the semifinals to Catholic Conference champion St. John's Prep by a score of 35–7. Head coach Dennis Golden was named New England Patriots High School Coach of the Week following the victory over Brockton. In the following season, the Whalers finished the regular season at 5-5 overall and 1–1 in the Big Three. Although they were defeated by Brockton 38-9 for the conference title, a conference by-law states that the playoff representative must have a record of .500 or better. On Thanksgiving, New Bedford defeated Durfee 18-16 while Brockton lost to Bridgewater-Raynham Regional High School 14–8 to finish the season at 5–6, giving the Whalers the right to represent the Big Three in the Division I Super Bowl for a second consecutive year. They will face the Bay State Conference's Carey Division champion Needham High School in the semifinals on Tuesday, November 29. Traditionally, New Bedford High School has had an intense rivalry with Durfee, with their Thanksgiving Day match-up, as the highlight of the season.
 
In 2013, New Bedford Whalers head coach Dennis Golden stepped down from the position. He compiled a record of 43-59-1, including 3 Big Three Conference titles and 6 straight wins against rival Durfee during his 10 years as head coach. Golden's offensive coordinator Mark DeBrito will take over as head coach for the 2014 Whalers football season.

Football Accomplishments
 Division 1A State Champions - 1993, 1994
 Division 1A State Finalists - 1995, 1997, 1999
 Division 3 State Finalists - 1985
 Big Three Conference Champions - 1985, 1993, 1994, 1995, 1997, 1999, 2010, 2011, 2013

Soccer

In 2010, the Whalers' boys' soccer team played against powerhouse the Ludlow Lions in the Division I State final, their first since 1978. They lost to Ludlow by a score of 4–1. Head coach John Macaroco was named a Coach of the Year by the Boston Globe.

 Boys' Soccer D-I State Champions - 1971
 Boys' Soccer D-I State Finalists - 1978, 2010

Wrestling

The wrestling team won the Big 3 Championship in 2016, as well as the D1S sectional, and placed 4th in the Division 1 state tournament.

Army Junior Reserve Officers Training Corps
New Bedford High School is also home of the Whaler JROTC.  New Bedford's JROTC program is notable for being the longest in continuous operation since inception.  The Army JROTC at New Bedford has received many awards.

Show Choir & Drama Club
New Bedford High School also has a mixed show choir "Pure Energy."  They have won many awards, the most recent being the 2009 Grand Champions at the New England Show Choir Classic. The group varies between 40 and 50 members.
The school is also the home of another show choir "Charisma". This group is made up of only females and consists of about 30 members. They have recently won Copper Trophy award at the New England Show Choir Classic and in the past have won Grand Champion in their division.
A majority of the choir members also participate in the school's award-winning drama club.

Notable alumni
André Bernier, 1977: television meteorologist
Armand Cure, 1938: professional football and basketball player
Charles Reis Felix, 1941: writer
Keith Francis, 1972: Middle-distance runner, High School State and New England champion, NCAA champion and 7-time All-American at Boston College
Brian Helgeland, 1980: screenwriter and director
Marques Houtman, 1997: basketball player for the Cape Verde national basketball team
Irwin M. Jacobs, 1950: co-founder of Qualcomm, billionaire, philanthropist
Theodore Morde (born 1911): adventurer, explorer, diplomat, spy, journalist, and television news producer
Sean Nelson, 1987:  musician, journalist, music critic, and filmmaker
Laurie Santos, 1993: Yale University professor
Jared Shuster (born 1998): baseball pitcher, first round 2020 MLB draft pick

References

External links

New Bedford High School website
New Bedford Public Schools website
New Bedford High School/WIMC-TV page on HighSchoolSports.com

 http://scvbb.wordpress.com/2008/04/01/new-bedford-high-school-baseball-150-years-ago/

Buildings and structures in New Bedford, Massachusetts
Schools in Bristol County, Massachusetts
Public high schools in Massachusetts
Boston Minutemen
North American Soccer League (1968–1984) stadiums
1827 establishments in Massachusetts